Forgiveness and Love is a 2012 book by Glen Pettigrove, in which the author explores the nature and norms of forgiveness and examines the relationship between forgiving, understanding, and loving.

References

External links 
 Forgiveness and Love
 Forgiveness and Love from bible

2012 non-fiction books
Oxford University Press books
Books about the philosophy of love
Moral psychology